Partiaga is a department or commune of Tapoa Province in eastern Burkina Faso. Its capital is the town of Partiaga.

The most recent census conducted in 2019 reports a population of 101,439.

Towns and villages

References

Departments of Burkina Faso
Tapoa Province